Pyshka or ponchik (pl. pyshki пышки; пончик, pl. ponchiki пончики) is a Russian variety of doughnut.

Types
Pyshki are either ring-shaped or without a hole.

Regional name variations
In Saint Petersburg and Novosibirsk, the dish is called "pyshka" and the cafe is called "pyshechnaya". In Moscow, it is called "ponchik", the doughnut eatery is called "ponchikovaya".

References

External links
 Searching for signs of the Soviets in St Petersburg. The Guardian.

Soviet cuisine
Russian cuisine